Cogley may refer to:

People
 Josh Dacres-Cogley, English footballer
 Nick Cogley (1869–1936), American actor
 Peter Čögley (born 1988), Slovak footballer

Places
 Cogley Island, Pennsylvania, USA
 Cogley Wood, Somerset, England